Tel Yarmuth (also Tel Yarmouth and Tel Yarmut; Hebrew name) or Khirbet Yarmuk (Arabic name) is an ancient Near East archaeological site in Israel located 25 kilometers southwest of Jerusalem and near modern Beit Shemesh. It is a large single-period (EB II/III) site and has been suggested as possibly being the city of Jarmuth, being only a tentative identification, as it is based solely on the similarity of the Hebrew name with the Arabic name and its areal location.<ref>{{cite book |last=Aharoni|first=Y. |author-link=Yohanan Aharoni |title=The Land of the Bible: A Historical Geography|edition=2 |publisher=Westminster Press |location=Philadelphia|year=1979|page=437 |language=en|isbn=0664242669 |oclc=6250553}} (original Hebrew edition: 'Land of Israel in Biblical Times - Historical Geography', Bialik Institute, Jerusalem (1962))</ref>

History
Early Bronze Age
Chronologically the city reached its peak at the same time as the Old Kingdom in Egypt and the Early Dynastic III period in Mesopotamia. After that the city was abandoned, with modest occupation in later periods.

Early Bronze period material from Tel Yarmuth has been radiocarbon dated and is being used to support the contention that EB III ended around 2500 BC. Samples tested were "3 from Final EB IB, 15 from EB II, and 19 from EB III". Results were  Final EB IB to EB II transition between 3030 and 2960 BC, EB II to EB III transition between 2980 and 2910 BC.Regev, Johanna, et al. "WIGGLE-MATCHED 14C CHRONOLOGY OF EARLY BRONZE MEGIDDO AND THE SYNCHRONIZATION OF EGYPTIAN AND LEVANTINE CHRONOLOGIES." Ägypten Und Levante / Egypt and the Levant, vol. 24, 20, pp. 241–64, 2014

Early Bronze IB
The only notable EB IB find was a basalt spindle whorl.

Early Bronze II-III
The entire site including the lower town was heavily occupied in the Early Bronze (EB) II and III periods. P. de Miroschedji., "The Early Bronze Age Fortifications at Tel Yarmut – An Update", Publication Name: Eretz-Israel, Archaeological, Historical and Geographical Studies, vol. 33 (Stager Volume), 2018  The site was abandoned around 2400 BC, during EB III.

The EB II and III monumental construction includes the large "White Building", a plastered masonry broad-room temple with a side altar. At its peak the city had massive sophisticated fortifications and a large main city gate (Area E). The first city wall (Wall A) was made of stone, was 6 meters deep and is preserved to 4 meters in height. A larger wall (Wall B) was later added outside of that built of cyclopean construction. The fortifications were subsequently improved even further. A number of EB III flint Canaanite blades, believed to be used as sickle inserts or in threshing, were found.

Middle Bronze
The acropolis was lightly re-occupied, based on pottery shard finds, in the Middle Bronze IIA.

Late Bronze
The site saw some occupation in the Late Bronze II. It included 13th century BC Mycenaean and Cypriot shards. The only other epigraphic find was a hoe with a partial hieroglyphic inscription in a hoard of bronze objects, mostly fragmentary. They were dated to the time of the 19th Dynasty (12th century BC) and may not be in their original context.

Iron Age
Somewhat more substantial building occurred on the acropolis in Iron I times. Finds from that period included a 2nd-century BC cooking pot with a yršlm'' (Jerusalem) stamp.

According to old Hebrew canonical books, compiled during the late Bronze Age, Yarmuth (English text: Jarmuth) is mentioned along with the cities Adullam and Socho as occupying a place in the Land of Canaan, in the region geographically known as the Shefelah,  or what is a place of transition between the mountainous region and the coastal plains. It was one of many city-states with independent and sovereign kings. According to the same source, the king of Yarmuth (Jarmuth) was slain by Joshua and the Israelites during their conquest of the land of Canaan.

Persian period
The only record of Yarmuth for this time-period (c. 539–331 BCE) is taken from the Hebrew Bible, specifically the account of Nehemiah who returned with the Jewish exiles from the Babylonian captivity, during the reign of Artaxerxes I. According to Ezra, the acclaimed author of the book, some of these returnees had settled in Yarmuth, as shown by the Book of Nehemiah. The political entity that was established in Judea at the time was that of a vassal state, as Judea became a province of the Persian Empire, governed by a satrap.

Byzantine period
Some Early Byzantine era terraces and shards were found in the lower town area.

Layout and topography
The site is about 18 hectares (44.479 acres) in extent. The high point, 1.8 hectares (4.447 acres) in area, lies on the eastern side with a lower town extending to the west. The site is roughly 640 by 420 meters.

Research history
The mound, then known as Khirbet Yarmuk, was visited by French archaeologist Victor Guérin in 1863. American archaeologist Frederick J. Bliss, who visited the site at the start of the 20th-century, remarked seeing interior walls of a building that were 4 feet and 6 inches thick in diameter, and that early Roman and Arab pottery sherds could be seen there. A survey of the site was conducted by Adam Druks in 1963. A. Ben-Tor conducted a sounding there in 1970 on behalf of the Hebrew University.

Tel Yarmuth has been scientifically excavated since 1980 by Pierre de Miroschedji under the auspices of the French National Centre for Scientific Research (CNRS).

In 2014, extensive excavations were conducted at the site by the Israel Antiquities Authority (IAA). After 2016 the site was declared a national park and since then excavations have been conducted, under the auspices of the Israel Antiquities Authority, in preparation for public access. An extensive geophysical survey of the lower town was also completed.

See also
Cities of the ancient Near East

Gallery

References

External links
 Israel Antiquities Authority (IAA),  (in Hebrew)

Further reading

Connan, Jacques, et al. "Bitumens from Tell Yarmuth (Israel) from 2800 BCE to 1100 BCE: A unique case history for the study of degradation effects on the Dead Sea bitumen." Organic Geochemistry 168 (2022)
Manclossi Francesca, Rosen Steve A., De Miroschedji Pierre. The Canaanean Blades from Tel Yarmuth, Israel: A technological analysis. In: Paléorient, 2016, vol. 42, n°1. pp. 49–74. DOI : https://doi.org/10.3406/paleo.2016.5693
de MIROSCHEDJI, Pierre. “TELL YARMOUTH, UN SITE DU BRONZE ANCIEN EN ISRAEL.” Paléorient, vol. 6, 1980, pp. 281–86.
Paz, Y., Mizrahi, S., and Grossman, L., "Ancient Fields: An EB III Case Study from Tel Yarmuth", New Studies in the Archaeology of Jerusalem and Its Region, 9: 91–98, 2015
Salavert, Aurélie. "Olive Cultivation and Oil Production in Palestine during the Early Bronze Age (3500—2000 B.C.): The Case of Tel Yarmouth, Israel.", Vegetation History and Archaeobotany, vol. 17, pp. S53–61, 2008

Archaeological sites in Israel
Hebrew Bible places
Levitical cities
Canaanite cities
Tells (archaeology)
Ancient Jewish settlements of Judaea
Bronze Age sites in Israel
Geography of Palestine (region)